The 1991–92 Biathlon World Cup was a multi-race tournament over a season of biathlon, organised by the UIPMB (Union Internationale de Pentathlon Moderne et Biathlon). The season started on 19 December 1991 in Hochfilzen, Austria, and ended on 22 March 1992 in Novosibirsk, Russia. It was the 15th season of the Biathlon World Cup.

The men's individual and women's sprint were moved from Holmenkollen, Norway to Skrautvål, Norway, due to rain and fog, with the planned relays being cancelled. The fifth round of the World Cup was originally going to be held in Kokkola, Finland, but were moved to Skrautvål due to a lack of snow.

Calendar
Below is the World Cup calendar for the 1991–92 season.

 Results from the Olympics did not count toward the World Cup.
 The relays were technically unofficial races as they did not count towards anything in the World Cup.

World Cup Podium

Men

Women

Men's team

Women's team

Standings: Men

Overall 

Final standings after 12 races.

Individual 

Final standings after 6 races.

Sprint 

Final standings after 6 races.

Nation 

Final standings after 17 races.

Standings: Women

Overall 

Final standings after 12 races.

Individual 

Final standings after 6 races.

Sprint 

Final standings after 6 races.

Nation 

Final standings after 17 races.

Medal table

Achievements

Men
First World Cup career victory
, 25, in his 4th season — the WC 1 Individual in Hochfilzen; it also was his first podium
, 26, in his 3rd season — the WC 3 Individual in Antholz-Anterselva; it also was his first podium
, 29, in his 6th season — the WC 4 Sprint in Holmenkollen; first podium was the 1989–90 Individual in Walchsee
, 27, in his 4th season — the WC 5 Sprint in Skrautvål; first podium was the 1990–91 Individual in Canmore
, 24, in his 2nd season — the WC 6 Individual in Novosibirsk; first podium was the 1991–92 Sprint in Holmenkollen
, 24, in his 6th season — the WC 6 Sprint in Novosibirsk; it also was his first podium

First World Cup podium
, 25, in his 5th season — no. 2 in the WC 1 Sprint in Hochfilzen
, 26, in his 5th season — no. 3 in the WC 1 Sprint in Hochfilzen
, 24, in his 4th season — no. 2 in the WC 2 Sprint in Ruhpolding
, 23, in his 5th season — no. 3 in the WC 3 Sprint in Antholz-Anterselva
, 24, in his 2nd season — no. 2 in the WC 4 Sprint in Holmenkollen
, 24, in his 2nd season — no. 3 in the WC 4 Sprint in Holmenkollen
, 22, in his 6th season — no. 3 in the WC 5 Individual in Skrautvål

Victory in this World Cup (all-time number of victories in parentheses)
, 2 (5) first places
, 2 (2) first places
, 1 (4) first place
, 1 (2) first place
, 1 (2) first place
, 1 (1) first place
, 1 (1) first place
, 1 (1) first place
, 1 (1) first place
, 1 (1) first place

Women
Victory in this World Cup (all-time number of victories in parentheses)
 , 4 (4) first places
 , 1 (6) first place
 , 1 (5) first place
 , 1 (5) first place
 , 1 (3) first place
 , 1 (2) first place
 , 1 (2) first place
 , 1 (2) first place
 , 1 (1) first place

Retirements
Following notable biathletes retired after the 1991–92 season:

References

Biathlon World Cup
World Cup
World Cup